Casa Grande Valley Newspapers Inc.  is a family owned and operated newspaper and commercial printing company based in Casa Grande, Arizona. Since its inception, it has grown to 6 community newspapers, 4 specialty publications, 3 news websites and a digital marketing division. CGVNI prints all of its publications and those of its sister company, White Mountain Publishing, at its plant in downtown Casa Grande. It recently built a  warehouse to store its newsprint rolls in the Central Arizona Commerce Park. Its flagship is the Casa Grande Dispatch.

Publications

White Mountain Publishing

References 

Newspaper companies of the United States
Casa Grande, Arizona
Family-owned companies of the United States